The Pride of Nicholls is the marching band which represents Nicholls State University in Thibodaux, Louisiana. The Pride of Nicholls performs pregame and during halftime at all Nicholls Colonels home football games, selected away games and in exhibitions at selected marching festivals during the fall semester.

The 6th Man Basketball Band performs at all home games during the spring semester and accompanies the Nicholls Colonels men's basketball team to the Southland Conference Basketball Tournament.

Music
Nicholls State University Alma Mater
Nicholls State Colonels Fight Song

See also
Nicholls Colonels
Nicholls State University

References

External links
 
 6th Man Basketball band website
 Nicholls State University Music Website 
 Nicholls Colonels athletics website

College marching bands in the United States
Nicholls Colonels
Nicholls Colonels football
Nicholls Colonels men's basketball